Edgewood is a historic tobacco plantation house and national historic district located near Grassy Creek, Granville County, North Carolina.  The house was built about 1858, and is a two-story, double pile, Greek Revival style frame dwelling with Italianate style design elements.  It has a low hipped roof pierced by two interior brick chimneys.  Also on the property are the contributing meat house, "wash house," two stables, brooder house, ice house, two chicken houses, two corn cribs, and a hay barn.

It was listed on the National Register of Historic Places in 1988.

References

Tobacco plantations in the United States
Plantation houses in North Carolina
Farms on the National Register of Historic Places in North Carolina
Historic districts on the National Register of Historic Places in North Carolina
Greek Revival houses in North Carolina
Italianate architecture in North Carolina
Houses completed in 1858
Houses in Granville County, North Carolina
National Register of Historic Places in Granville County, North Carolina